Nishat Linen is a Pakistani clothing brand which sells ready-to-wear, unstitched clothes. 

It is based in Lahore, Pakistan, and it is one of largest retailers in Pakistan.

History
Nishat Linen was founded in 1989 by Naaz Mansha, the wife of Pakistani businessman, Mian Muhammad Mansha. Naaz Mansha is also known for running Inglot Cosmetics and Swarovski retail chains in Pakistan.

In 1989, a factory owned by Nishat Linen became operational.

In 1994, the first retail store of Nishat Linen was opened.

References

Clothing companies of Pakistan
Nishat Group
Companies established in 1989